Countess of Northumberland is a title given to the wife of the Earl of Northumberland. Women who have held the title include:

Eleanor Neville, Countess of Northumberland (c.1397-1472)
Mary Percy, Countess of Northumberland (died 1572)
Anne Percy, Countess of Northumberland (1536-1596)
Dorothy Percy, Countess of Northumberland (c.1564-1619)
Elizabeth Percy, Countess of Northumberland (1646-1690)